Trzcianka  is a village in the administrative district of Gmina Osiek, within Staszów County, Świętokrzyskie Voivodeship, in south-central Poland.

The village has a population of  217.

Demography 
According to the 2002 Poland census, there were 212 people residing in Trzcianka village, of whom 54.2% were male and 45.8% were female. In the village, the population was spread out, with 18.4% under the age of 18, 42.9% from 18 to 44, 21.2% from 45 to 64, and 17.5% who were 65 years of age or older.
 Figure 1. Population pyramid of village in 2002 — by age group and sex

Former parts of village — physiographic objects 
In the years 1970 of last age, sorted and prepared out list part of names of localities for Trzcianka Dolna and Trzcianka Górna — at type of settlement now is a one village Trzcianka, what you can see in table 3.

References

Villages in Staszów County